Frederick William Dobson, VC (9 November 1886 – 15 November 1935) was an English recipient of the Victoria Cross, the highest and most prestigious award for gallantry in the face of the enemy that can be awarded to British and Commonwealth forces.

Dobson was 27 years old, and a private in the 2nd Battalion, Coldstream Guards, British Army during the First World War when the following deed at the First Battle of the Aisne took place for which he was awarded the VC.

On 28 September 1914 at Chavonne, Aisne, France, Private Dobson twice volunteered to go out under heavy fire to bring in two wounded men. This undertaking involved crossing a good deal of open ground in full view of the enemy. Private Dobson, however, crawled out and found one of the men dead and the other wounded. He dressed the wounds and then crawled back, to return with a corporal and a stretcher, on to which they put the wounded man and then dragged him back to safety.

He later achieved the rank of lance-corporal. His Victoria Cross is displayed at The Guards Regimental Headquarters (Coldstream Guards RHQ), Wellington Barracks in London.

VC Commemoration
As part of the United Kingdom national commemoration of the First World War memorial stones of VC recipients of that war were laid in their birth places. Dobson was born in Ovingham, Northumberland on 19 November 1886. Northumberland County Council organised a church service to unveil the VC Memorial Stone to Frederick Dobson VC on 27 September 2014.

References

Monuments to Courage (David Harvey, 1999)
The Register of the Victoria Cross (This England, 1997)
VCs of the First World War - 1914 (Gerald Gliddon, 1994)

External links
Location of grave and VC medal (Co. Durham)
History of High Spen, where Dobson lived
Memorial to two village heroes at High Spen Primary School

1886 births
1935 deaths
People from Ovingham
People from High Spen
British World War I recipients of the Victoria Cross
Coldstream Guards soldiers
British Army personnel of World War I
British Army recipients of the Victoria Cross
Military personnel from Northumberland